Dacheng Township is a rural township in Changhua County, Taiwan.

Geography
Dacheng is located on the north bank of the Zhuoshui River, at the river's mouth where it flows into the Taiwan Strait. It encompasses  and a population of 15,425, including 9,335 males and 7,921 females as of January 2023.

Administrative divisions
The township comprises 15 villages: Cailiao, Dacheng, Dingzhuang, Fengmei, Gongguan, Sanfeng, Shangshan, Shanjiao, Taixi, Tanqi, Tungcheng, Tunggang, Xicheng, Xigang and Yonghe.

Tourist attractions 
 Xian'an Temple

Notable natives
 Joseph Wu, Minister of Foreign Affairs

References

External links

  

Townships in Changhua County